The spotted salamander or yellow-spotted salamander (Ambystoma maculatum) is a mole salamander common in eastern United States and Canada. It is the state amphibian of Ohio and South Carolina. The species ranges from Nova Scotia, to Lake Superior, to southern Georgia and Texas. Its embryos have been found to have symbiotic algae living in and around them, the only known example of vertebrate cells hosting an endosymbiont microbe (unless mitochondria are considered).

Description

They are stout, like most mole salamanders, and have wide snouts. The spotted salamander's main color is black, but can sometimes be a blueish-black, dark gray, dark green, or even dark brown. Two uneven rows of yellowish-orange spots run from the top of the head (near the eyes) to the tip of the tail. The spotted salamander's spots near the top of its head are more orange, while the spots on the rest of its body are more yellow. The underside of the spotted salamander is slate gray and pink. Sexual dimorphism, physical differences between males and females, is displayed in the form of larger-bodied females having brighter-coloured spots.

The scientific name Ambystoma maculatum comes from Ambystoma– amblys (Greek) for blunt; -stoma (Greek) meaning mouth; or anabystoma (New Latin) meaning ‘to cram into the mouth’ maculatum – macula (Latin) for spot; maculosus (Latin) for spotted.

Habitat and dispersal
The spotted salamander usually lives in mature forests with ponds or ephemeral vernal pools for breeding sites. Vernal pools are suitable breeding sites for these amphibians as they dry often enough to exclude fish that eat the salamander eggs and larvae, while retaining water long enough to allow amphibian larvae to complete development and metamorphose into terrestrial adults.

Salamander populations from nearby pools form genetically-distinct metapopulations. Subpopulations within 4.8 kilometers share a higher proportion of genes, while populations greater than 4.8 kilometers share a smaller proportion of genes. Inter-population dispersal is likely mediated by both species-specific behaviors and natural limitations.

Behavior
Spotted salamanders are fossorial, meaning they spend most of their time underground. They rarely come above ground, except after a rain or for foraging and breeding. During the winter, they brumate underground, and are not seen again until breeding season in early March–May.

Ambystoma maculatum has several methods of defense, including hiding in burrows or leaf litter, autotomy of the tail, and a toxic milky liquid it excretes when perturbed. This secretion comes from large poison glands around the back and neck. The spotted salamander, like other salamanders, shows great regenerative abilities: if a predator manages to dismember a part of a leg, tail, or even parts of the brain, head, or organs, the salamander can grow back a new one, although this takes a massive amount of energy. As juveniles, they spend most of their time under the leaf litter near the bottom of the pools where their eggs were laid. The larvae tend to occupy refuges in vegetation, and lower their activity in the presence of predators.

Ambystoma maculatum tend to follow the same path in their migration to and from their burrows and breeding pools. They accomplish their journey in conditions that lack visual cues, since it is usually during periods of cloud cover. Some studies show evidence of landmark learning in spotted salamanders. Researchers found that spotted salamanders can associate visual landmarks with food. Thus spotted salamanders may learn landmarks in their habitat that are reliable indicators of resource locations or provide orientation clues for migration to and from breeding ponds.

Diet
Spotted salamanders feed on earthworms, slugs, snails, spiders, millipedes, centipedes, insects, algae and other invertebrates. They sometimes also feed on smaller salamanders, such as the red-backed salamander. The adult spotted salamander uses its sticky tongue to catch food.

Lifecycle

During the majority of the year, spotted salamanders live in the shelter of leaves or burrows in deciduous forests. However, when the temperature rises and the moisture level is high, the salamanders make their abrupt migration towards their annual breeding ponds. In just one night, hundreds to thousands of salamanders may make the trip to their ponds for mating. Males migrate at higher rates than females early in the migration season. This could be due to different responses to temperature between males and females. Mates usually breed in ponds when it is raining in the spring. Females usually lay about 100 eggs in one clutch that cling to the underwater plants and form egg masses.

The spotted salamander produces a unique polymorphism in the outer jelly layers of its egg masses: one morph has a clear appearance and contains a water-soluble protein, whereas the other morph is white and contains a crystalline hydrophobic protein. This polymorphism is thought to confer advantages in vernal pools with varying dissolved nutrient levels, while also reducing mortality from feeding by wood frog larvae.

Adults only stay in the water for a few days, then the eggs hatch in one to two months. When the eggs hatch depends on the water temperatures. Eggs of A. maculatum can have a symbiotic relationship with the green alga Oophila amblystomatis. A dense gelatinous matrix surrounds the eggs and prevents the eggs from drying out, but it inhibits oxygen diffusion (required for embryo development). The Oophila alga provides increased oxygen and supplemental nutrition from fixed carbon products via photosynthesis and removes the embryo’s nitrogenous waste (ammonia) in the egg capsule, aiding in the salamander's embryonic development and growth. The developing salamander thus metabolizes the oxygen, producing carbon dioxide (which then the alga consumes). Photosynthetic algae are present within the egg capsule of the developing salamander embryo, enhancing growth. However, the widely used herbicide, atrazine, has been found to significantly lower hatching success rate by eliminating the symbiotic algae associated with the egg masses.  As larvae, they are usually light brown or greenish-yellow. They have small dark spots and are born with external gills. In two to four months, the larvae lose their gills, and become juvenile salamanders that leave the water. Spotted salamanders have been known to live up to 32 years, and normally return to the same vernal pool every year. These pools are seasonal and will usually dry up during the late spring and stay dry until winter.

Spotted salamanders are often preyed on by raccoons, skunks, turtles, and snakes. However, one of their top predators is humans since they are popularly sought out through the pet trade.

References

External links

Ambystoma maculatum at CalPhotos
Ambystoma maculatum: Information at ADW

Yellow-spotted Salamander (Ambystoma maculatum), Natural Resources Canada

Mole salamanders
Salamander, Spotted
Salamander, Spotted
Aposematic species
Salamander, Spotted
Salamander, Spotted
Salamander, Spotted
Salamander, Spotted
Amphibians described in 1802
Taxa named by George Shaw